The axocele (from the Greek elements  meaning "axis" and  meaning "hollow") designates a portion of the coelom in echinoderms. This is the part extending from the protocele, ie the uppermost portion of the coelom. It is created in larval pairs, with the left axocele developing into a channel between the hydrocele and the madreporite. The right axocele is reduced to a small dorsal blade.

Echinoderm anatomy